St. Tammany Parish Public Schools is a public school district serving the children of St. Tammany Parish, located along the Northshore banks of Lake Pontchartrain in southeast Louisiana, United States. The district's Central Office is located in downtown Covington, on the site of the original Covington High School and the former sites of the Covington Grammar School and C.J. Schoen Middle School. The district also has an annex location in Slidell, Louisiana, to serve the east side of St. Tammany Parish.

STPPS was again rated as an "A" district by the Louisiana Department of Education in 2017. The fifth-largest school district in the state, St. Tammany Parish Public Schools serves nearly 39,000 students in 55 schools. It is the largest employer in St. Tammany Parish, employing more than 5,800 people. All STPPS teachers are certified with more than 50 percent of all teachers holding a master's degree or more. In 2018-2019, STPPS students posted an average composite score of 21.2 on the ACT, leading the state of Louisiana.

St. Tammany Parish Public School System programs, students, and employees are widely recognized throughout the nation. Students continue to score above national and state levels on standardized tests used to measure student achievement. A majority of graduates choose to further their education and are accepted at colleges and universities throughout the country.

In addition to being a leader in education, the St. Tammany Parish Public School System is an economic engine for the region and a good steward of taxpayer dollars. It has the highest bond rating of any public school board in Louisiana.

Preparing Students for Success 

In 2018–2019, more than 2,370 students graduated and they received a combined $100 million in scholarships and TOPS funding. During the same school year, STPPS students earned 15,519 dual enrollment credit hours and 5,261 industry-based certifications earned in career tech programs.

Schools
STPPS is a public school system in the state of Louisiana with 55 schools serving St. Tammany Parish.

History

Fourteen superintendents have led the St. Tammany Parish Public School System since its inception in 1900. Four current STPPS schools are named after former superintendents - Lancaster Elementary, Lyon Elementary, Pitcher Junior High, and Monteleone Junior High. The current superintendent, Frank Jabbia, took the position in October 2020.

 Joseph B. Lancaster (1900-1904)
 H.A. Verret (1904-1905)
 W.G. Evans (1905-1909)
 A.B. Peters (1909-1910)
 H.B. Messick (1910-1911)
 Elmer E. Lyon (1911-1937)
 William Pitcher (1937-1967)
 Cyprian J. "Cyp" Schoen (1967-1986)
 Richard Tanner (1986, Acting)
 Terry J. Bankston (1986-1995)
 Leonard P. Monteleone (1995-2003)
 Gayle Sloan (2003-2010)
 W.L. "Trey" Folse, III (2010-2019)
 Peter J. Jabbia, Interim (2020)
 Frank Jabbia (2020-present)

School Board members

 Matthew E. Greene, District 1
 Elizabeth B. Heintz, District 2
 Michael J. Dirmann, District 3
 Stephen J. "Jack" Loup III, District 4
 C. Brandon Harrell, District 5 (Vice President)
 Michael C. Nation, District 6 (President)
 Shelta J. Richardson, District 7
 Michael E. Winkler, District 8
 Sharon Lo Drucker, District 9
 Ronald "Ron" Bettencourtt, District 10
 Tammy Lamy, District 11
 Richard "Rickey" Hursey Jr., District 12
 James Braud, District 13
 Dennis S. Cousin, District 14
 Lisa M. Page, District 15

References

External links

Education in St. Tammany Parish, Louisiana
School districts in Louisiana
St. Tammany Parish, Louisiana